The 2016 Hawaii Senate elections took place as part of the biennial United States elections. Hawaii voters elected state senators in 14 of the state senate's 25 districts. State senators serve four-year terms in the Hawaii Senate.

The primary election took place on August 13, 2016. The general election also took place on November 8, 2016. Republican Sam Slom lost his bid for re-election, leaving the Democrats with no opposition in the Senate.

Election results

Source for primary results: Source for general election results:

District 1

District 2

District 5 

General election
Incumbent Democrat Gilbert Keith-Agaran was automatically reelected without opposition, with no votes recorded.

District 8 

General election
Incumbent Democrat Ron Kouchi was automatically reelected without opposition, with no votes recorded.

District 9

District 10

District 11

District 13

District 14 

General election
Incumbent Democrat Donna Mercado Kim was automatically reelected without opposition, with no votes recorded.

District 15

District 19

District 20 

General election
Incumbent Democrat Mike Gabbard was automatically reelected without opposition, with no votes recorded.

District 22 

General election
Incumbent Democrat Donovan Dela Cruz was automatically reelected without opposition, with no votes recorded.

District 25

References

Senate
Hawaii Senate elections
Hawaii Senate